Cloves Campbell Jr. was a member of the Arizona House of Representatives from 2003 through 2011. A Democrat, he was first elected to the House in November 2006, and was re-elected in 2008. His second attempt at re-election was unsuccessful, when he lost to Ruben Gallego and Catherine H. Miranda in the 2010 Democratic primary. Campbell is the son of Cloves Campbell Sr. and the publisher of the Arizona Informant.

References

African-American state legislators in Arizona
Democratic Party members of the Arizona House of Representatives
Living people
Year of birth missing (living people)
21st-century American politicians